The 1995 UCLA Bruins softball team represented the University of California, Los Angeles in the 1995 NCAA Division I softball season. The Bruins were coached by Sharron Backus, who led her twenty-first season, and Sue Enquist, in her seventh season, in an uncommon co-head coach system. The Bruins played their home games at Easton Stadium and finished with a record of 50–6. They competed in the Pacific-10 Conference, where they finished second with a 23–4 record.

The Bruins were invited to the 1995 NCAA Division I softball tournament, where they swept the West Regional and then completed a run through the Women's College World Series to claim their seventh NCAA Women's College World Series Championship. The Bruins had earlier claimed an AIAW title in 1978 and NCAA titles in 1982, 1984, 1988, 1989, 1990, and 1992.

The Bruins' participation and championship were later vacated by the NCAA.  In December 1995, the UCLA women's softball program was placed on probation after an investigation revealed that UCLA had awarded more scholarships than were permitted under NCAA rules. The Fresno Bee wrote that the violations "bring shame to college softball" and added, "The image of UCLA's softball program won't ever be the same. ... For two seasons, they went over the scholarship limit, the equivalent of cheating on taxes. Now they must pay."

Partly as a result of an NCAA probe prompted by a Los Angeles Times investigation into UCLA pitcher Tanya Harding, Backus announced her retirement in January 1997.

Personnel

Roster

Coaches

Schedule

References

UCLA
UCLA Bruins softball seasons
1995 in sports in California
Women's College World Series seasons
NCAA Division I softball tournament seasons